"The Last of the Real Ones" is a song by American rock band Fall Out Boy, released on September 14, 2017 in North America and September 15, 2017 worldwide. It was released as the third single from the band's seventh studio album, Mania (2018). The song was played live on Jimmy Kimmel Live! on September 18, 2017, after being debuted at House of Blues in Chicago on September 16.

The song was released to alternative radio on May 1, 2018. On June 28, 2018, a remix was released featuring Bülow and MadeinTYO.

The song is featured in the soundtrack of NBA 2K19.

Background 
Pete Wentz described the song as "the closest thing to a love song we've had but it's pretty fucking twisted still."

Composition

Critics have described the song as pop rock, synth-pop, electronic rock, and rock

Music video
The music video for "The Last of the Real Ones" debuted on the same day as the single was released. It features Wentz being attacked by llamas with a shovel after being tied up in the back of a car.

It bears a striking resemblance to the music video for Kanye West's song "Flashing Lights" where Kanye is similarly tied up in the back of a car and is attacked by a woman with a shovel. The video was directed by the duo Mccoy | Meyer.

Track listing

Credits and personnel
Fall Out Boy
 Patrick Stump – lead vocals, rhythm guitars, piano, programming, composition
 Pete Wentz – bass, composition
 Joe Trohman – lead guitars, composition
 Andy Hurley – drums, percussion, composition

Production
 Carlo "Illangelo" Montagnese – composition, production

Charts

Weekly charts

Year-end charts

Certifications

References

Fall Out Boy songs
2017 songs
Songs written by Patrick Stump
Songs written by Pete Wentz
Songs written by Joe Trohman
Songs written by Andy Hurley
Island Records singles
Song recordings produced by Illangelo
Songs written by Illangelo